Deborah James,  is a South African anthropologist and academic, who specialises in South Africa, economic anthropology, political anthropology, and ethnography.

Since 2008, she has been Professor of Anthropology at the London School of Economics in England.

Career
She was previously an academic at the South African Institute of Race Relations, the University of the Witwatersrand, and the University of KwaZulu-Natal, all in South Africa. She was born in South Africa, grew up under apartheid, and was educated at the University of the Witwatersrand.

Research
James's research has focused on the anthropology of South Africa and the United Kingdom. Her studies of economic anthropology have resulted in publications relating to debt and land reform in South Africa, and the effects of austerity on the United Kingdom. She is also interested in the relationships between people and the state.

Awards and recognition
In 2008, James was awarded the Eliot P Skinner Prize by the Association for Africanist Anthropology for her book Gaining Ground?: "Rights" and "Property" in South African Land Reform (2007). In 2016, she was awarded the inaugural Fage and Oliver Prize by the African Studies Association of the United Kingdom for her book Money from Nothing: indebtedness and aspiration in South Africa (2015). In 2019, she was elected a Fellow of the British Academy (FBA), the United Kingdom's national academy for the humanities and social sciences.

Books

References

Living people
Year of birth missing (living people)
South African anthropologists
South African women anthropologists
South African Africanists
Ethnographers
Economic anthropologists
Academic staff of the University of the Witwatersrand
Academic staff of the University of KwaZulu-Natal
Academics of the London School of Economics
Fellows of the British Academy